Time Step may refer to:

 Time step, a rhythmic tap combination in tap dancing
 Time Step (album), a 1983 album by Leo Kottke